Pría is one of 28 parishes (administrative divisions) in Llanes, a municipality within the province and autonomous community of Asturias, in northern Spain.

Villages
Pria de la Cabuerna 
Garaña
La Pesa 
Llames 
Piñeres 
Silviella 
Villanueva

Parishes in Llanes